Cepi Watu Beach is a beach at the village of Nanga Labang, District Borong, East Manggarai Regency, East Nusa Tenggara province, Indonesia.

From this beach visitors can also see the sights of Mount Poco Ndeki.

Beaches of Indonesia
Landforms of East Nusa Tenggara